Mugilogobius platynotus, commonly known as the flatback mangrove goby, is a species of goby native to eastern Australia.

External links 
 Flatback Mangrove Goby, Mugilogobius platynotus (Günther 1861)

References 

platynotus
Fauna of New South Wales
Marine fish of Eastern Australia
Fish described in 1861
Taxa named by Albert Günther